Henry Brewster Stanton (1805–1887) was an American abolitionist and social activist.

Henry Stanton may also refer to:

Henry Thompson Stanton (1834–1899), American poet
Henry de Stanton, English medieval professor of canon law and university chancellor
Henry Stanton (Oz), fictional character in the HBO drama Oz
Henry Stanton (soldier) (c. 1796–1856), United States Army officer